A foot-candle (sometimes foot candle; abbreviated fc, lm/ft2, or sometimes ft-c) is a non-SI unit of illuminance or light intensity. The foot-candle is defined as one lumen per square foot. This unit is commonly used in lighting layouts in parts of the world where United States customary units are used, mainly the United States. Nearly all of the world uses the corresponding SI derived unit lux, defined as one lumen per square meter.

The foot-candle is defined as the illuminance of the inside surface of a one-foot-radius sphere with a point source of one candela at its center. Alternatively, it can be defined as the illuminance of one lumen on a one-square foot surface with a uniform distribution. Given the relation between candela and lumen, the two definitions listed are identical, with the second one potentially being easier to relate to in some everyday situations.

One foot-candle is equal to approximately 10.76 lux. In many practical applications, as when measuring room illumination, it is often not needed to measure illuminance more accurately than ±10%; in these situations it is sufficient to think of one foot-candle as about ten lux.

Use
In the US lighting industry, foot-candles are a common unit of measurement used by architects to calculate adequate lighting levels. Foot-candles are also commonly used in the museum and gallery fields in the US, where lighting levels must be carefully controlled to conserve light-sensitive objects such as prints, photographs, and paintings, the colors of which fade when exposed to bright light for a lengthy period.

In the motion picture cinematography field in the US, incident light meters are used to measure the number of foot-candles present, which are used to calculate the intensity of motion picture lights, allowing cinematographers to set up proper lighting-contrast ratios when filming.

Since light intensity is the primary factor in the photosynthesis of plants, US horticulturalists often measure and discuss optimum intensity for various plants in foot-candles.

Examples
Full, unobstructed sunlight has an intensity of approximately 10,000 fc.  An overcast day will produce an intensity of around 100 fc. The intensity of light near a window can range from 100 to 5,000 fc, depending on the orientation of the window, time of year and latitude.

Indoor lighting for residences seeks to provide 5-40 fc for general spaces and 70-90 fc for work spaces.

Lighting requirements for commercial spaces range from 5 fc for storage spaces to 200 fc for visually intensive work.

SI photometry units

See also
Photometry (optics) for more on the measurement of light

References

External links
Example chart of foot-candles and corresponding activities

Imperial units
Units of illuminance
Customary units of measurement in the United States